Brett Leon Szabo (born  in Postville, Iowa) is a retired American professional basketball player.

Career 
Szabo graduated from Postville High School, where he had played basketball, baseball and golf, in 1986. He was inducted into Postville’s Hall of Fame in 2005.

A 6'11" center, Szabo played for the NCAA Division II's Augustana College Vikings in South Dakota, amassing 1,520 points, 802 rebounds and 185 blocks. He was presented with All-North Central Conference honors in 1989 and 1990. Szabo was inducted into the Augustana Vikings' Hall of Fame in 2002.

He went undrafted in the 1991 NBA draft and later joined the Charlotte Hornets' training camp, before being waived. He played one season for the National Basketball Association's Boston Celtics (1996–97), playing 70 games while averaging 2.2 points and 2.4 rebounds. In the fall of 1997, he made the training camp of the Philadelphia 76ers, but was waived before season start.

CBA

Additionally, he played four seasons with as many teams in the Continental Basketball Association (mostly with the Sioux Falls Skyforce). His best CBA season came in 1994-95, when he averaged 5.6 points and 5.5 rebounds in 27 games for the Harrisburg Hammerheads.

Overseas

Szabo had stints in Kilsyth, Australia (in 1991), Germany (TG Renesas Landshut in 1995-96), Belgium (Castors Braine in 1997-98) and Slovakia (BC Slovakofarma Pezinok from 1998 to 2000). He retired in 2000. Suffering from double vision, Szabo wore corrective glasses during games.

References

External links
NBA stats @ Basketball-Reference
Basketpedya career data

1968 births
Living people
American expatriate basketball people in Belgium
American expatriate basketball people in Germany
American expatriate basketball people in Slovakia
Augustana (South Dakota) Vikings men's basketball players
Basketball players from Iowa
Boston Celtics players
Centers (basketball)
People from Postville, Iowa
Sioux Falls Skyforce (CBA) players
Undrafted National Basketball Association players
American men's basketball players